The Saltwick Formation is a Middle Jurassic geologic formation in Yorkshire and the western North Sea. It is primarily Aalenian in age. Fossil footprints, assigned to the tetrapod ichnogenus Characichnos, as well as stegosaur tracks have been reported from the formation. An indeterminate sauropod, nicknamed Alan, has also been reported from the formation.

See also

 List of dinosaur-bearing rock formations
 List of stratigraphic units with ornithischian tracks
 Stegosaur tracks

Footnotes

References
 Weishampel, David B.; Dodson, Peter; and Osmólska, Halszka (eds.): The Dinosauria, 2nd, Berkeley: University of California Press. 861 pp. .

Aalenian Stage
Ichnofossiliferous formations